The Sapucaí-Mirim River is a river that flows through the Brazilian states of São Paulo and Minas Gerais. Its source lies within the Mantiqueira Mountains and it discharges into the Sapucaí River.

Course 
The headwaters of the river are protected by the  Sapucaí Mirim Environmental Protection Area, created in 1998.
The  Fernão Dias Environmental Protection Area, created in 1997, also protects some of the headwaters.
In the state of São Paulo, the river passes by the municipalities of Santo Antônio do Pinhal and São Bento do Sapucaí. In the state of Minas Gerais, it passes by the municipalities of Sapucaí-Mirim, Gonçalves, Paraisópolis, Conceição dos Ouros, Cachoeira de Minas and Pouso Alegre.

Tributaries 
Its main tributaries are the Capivari River, Itaim River, Mandu River and the Ribeirão dos Ouros.

See also 
 List of rivers of Minas Gerais
 List of rivers of São Paulo

References 

Rivers of São Paulo (state)
Rivers of Minas Gerais